Cory Blair (born 28 June 1985) is an Australian born American rugby union player. Cory plays centre for his club, Huntington Beach, in California. He was selected to tour with the USA national rugby union team, the USA Eagles XV, for the Autumn 2010 tour of Europe. In 2010 he was named in the United States national rugby league team for the 2010 Atlantic Cup

His brother, Cheyse Blair, plays for Castleford Tigers in the Super League.

He currently plays rugby league for the Tweed Heads Seagulls.

References

External links
 Player Profile eaglesxv.com
 scrfu.org

1985 births
Living people
American rugby union players
American rugby league players
Rugby union centres
Rugby union fullbacks
Australian people of American descent
Rugby league centres
Rugby league players from Gold Coast, Queensland
Rugby union players from Queensland
Tweed Heads Seagulls players
Rugby league fullbacks